The Actor (French: L'acteur) is an oil on canvas painting by Spanish painter Pablo Picasso, created from 1904 to 1905. The painting dates from the artist's Rose Period. It is housed in the collection of the Metropolitan Museum of Art in New York City.

Background 
Prior to 1904, Picasso's work had been dominated by his melancholy Blue Period, which was defined by predominantly blue paintings of human suffering. The Actor illustrates a shift in Picasso's artistic approach, which was influenced by his meeting of his new partner, Fernande Olivier in 1904. Olivier's presence and influence on the tone, subject matter and palette of Picasso's artwork is notable in the sheet of studies that he created for The Actor around the time of New Year's Eve in 1904, which features two profiles of Olivier.

Description
Picasso painted The Actor during the winter of 1904 to 1905 when he was 23 years old. The painting is a work of the artist's Rose Period when he changed his painting style from the downbeat tones of his Blue Period to warmer and more romantic hues. It portrays an acrobat in a dramatic pose with an abstract design in the background. Picasso painted The Actor on the reverse side of a landscape painting by another artist because he could not afford new canvases at the time.

Significance and legacy 
The Actor was produced at a transitional point in Picasso's artwork, when he became inspired by the lives of harlequins and saltimbanques. The Metropolitan Museum of Art summarises the importance of this painting in relation to his subsequent works about travelling circus performers.Simple yet haunting, The Actor is the work with which Picasso ended his obsession with the wretched in favor of the theatrical world of acrobats and saltimbanques. Although the attenuated figure and extraordinary play of hands recall the El Greco-inspired mannerism of the Blue Period, The Actor can be seen as the prologue to the series of works that culminates in the enormous canvas Family of Saltimbanques.

Ownership, legal case, and value
First owned by Picasso's friend Frank Burty Haviland , it was sold in 1912 to Alice and Paul Friedrich Leffmann, originally of Cologne, Germany. Its first public display was at the Sonderbund exhibition in May 1912 in Cologne. In 1933, with Adolf Hitler's rise to power the conditions for Jews in Germany worsened. The Leffmanns, a German Jewish couple, suffered the Aryanization of their home and businesses by the Nazis.   The couple fled Germany in 1937 to Italy, and in 1938 to Switzerland and then to Brazil. The Leffmanns sold the painting in June 1938, for $13,200, to art dealers Paul Rosenberg and Hugo Perls, to fund their escape from the Nazis. The painting eventually was purchased in 1941 by heiress Thelma Chrysler Foy, the daughter of Walter Chrysler of the Chrysler automobile company, from the Knoedler gallery in New York, for $22,500. She donated it to the Metropolitan Museum of Art in New York City, in 1952, where it has since been displayed. 

In 2016, the heir of the Leffmanns sued the Metropolitan Museum of Art in U.S. federal court, seeking the return of the painting on the ground that the Leffmans had sold it under duress. In 2018, Judge Loretta A. Preska of the U.S. District Court for the Southern District of New York ruled in favor of the Met, ruling that the plaintiff could not show, under New York law, that the painting was sold under duress. The U.S. Court of Appeals for the Second Circuit affirmed the dismissal on the ground that the claim was raised too late (72 years after the work was sold and 58 years after it was donated to the art museum).

In 2010, experts estimated that the painting, which is one of the largest from Picasso's Rose Period, is worth more than US$100 million.

Damage
The museum stated that the rip did not affect the artwork's central subject. They also indicated that they intend to have the painting repaired in a few weeks by performing "unobtrusive" work. This was in preparation for an April 27 retrospective of roughly 250 of the artist's works.

See also
Le Rêve
Acrobat and Young Harlequin
Family of Saltimbanques
Girl on a Ball

External links 
The Actor at the Metropolitan Museum of Art

References

Portraits by Pablo Picasso
Portraits of men
1904 paintings
20th-century portraits
Paintings in the collection of the Metropolitan Museum of Art
Paintings of Montmartre
Circus paintings
1905 paintings